The Jug — formerly known as the Jug Handle — is a jug-shaped island formed by a horseshoe bend on Middle Island Creek near Middlebourne in Tyler County, West Virginia, USA.  It is maintained by the state of West Virginia as The Jug Wildlife Management Area (2,848 acres, including the Jug and much land south of it).

History
Middle Island Creek's most extreme meander forms a peninsula known as "the Jug," located upstream of Middlebourne. The creek rounds a 3.3 mile (5.3 km) bend only to return to within 100 feet (30 m) of itself.  Sometime prior to 1800, an early white settler named George Gregg had a raceway (mill race) carved across the narrow point of the peninsula and harnessed the resulting hydropower of the stream's 13-foot (4 m) fall for a gristmill and sawmill at the site.  These mills were destroyed by a flood in 1852; four more mills were subsequently built and respectively washed away by flooding in the later 19th century.  Flooding had the effect of widening the raceway across the peninsula such that it became the main channel of the stream, inhibiting the flow of water through the longer loop and transforming the peninsula to an island.  In 1947 the West Virginia Conservation Commission constructed a low water bridge which substantially dammed the cut-through and restored a steady flow to the bend of the creek. The low water bridge is known to be frequently impassable due to flooding.  The land encircled by the creek's loop is operated as a Wildlife Management Area by the state of West Virginia.

See also 
List of islands of West Virginia

References

External links 
 WVDNR District 6 Wildlife Management Areas
WVDNR map of The Jug Wildlife Management Area

Jug
Jug, The
Jug, The
Islands of Tyler County, West Virginia
IUCN Category V